The Azerbaijani Popular Front Party (APFP;) is a political party in Azerbaijan, founded in 1992 by Abulfaz Elchibey. After Elchibey's death in 2000, the party split into two wings, the reform wing led by Ali Kerimli and the classical wing led by Mirmahmud Miralioglu.

During the parliamentary elections, from 5 November 2000 - 7 January 2001,  the APFP won 11.0% of the popular vote and 6 out of 125 seats in the National Assembly of Azerbaijan. It's candidate Gudrat Hasanguliyev won 0.4% of the popular vote in the 2003 presidential elections. At the parliamentary elections of 6 November 2005, APF joined the Freedom block but won only one seat.

History

Popular Front of Azerbaijan
The Popular Front of Azerbaijan (PFA) was an organization established on July 16, 1988 in Azerbaijan that united several informal public organizations into one, working towards independence from the Soviet Union.

PFA came to unite several informal public organizations which were established in the 1980s to struggle for the independence of Azerbaijan from the Soviet Union. In 1987, Ali Karimli, a law school student, became the founder and leader of one of these informal organizations - "Yurd" ("Homeland") - that inspired and led thousands of students to the main square of Baku city to protest against the Soviet Union. As a result, a large-scale campaign of public demonstrations and meetings swept across Azerbaijan. Later, the movement was suppressed by the special forces of the Ministry of Defense and Ministry of Internal Affairs of the USSR. Despite this fact, the Popular Front of Azerbaijan was established and Yurd became an integral part of this movement.

In 1992, Abulfaz Elchibey, the leader of PFA, won the 1992 Azerbaijani presidential election. A period of political, social, and economic reforms followed. The laws on political parties, freedom of press, education, and others were adopted. The country chose a pro-western, liberal economic course and established the national currency, the Azerbaijani manat.

In April 1993, the Russian (formerly Soviet) army was withdrawn from Azerbaijan. Azerbaijan became the first republic in the former USSR, which achieved a full and unconditional withdrawal of Russian troops.

General Heydar Aliyev captured power in 1993 following the 1993 Azerbaijani coup d'état and the Subsequent vote of confidence referendum on Abulfaz Elchibey's presidency. Elchibey was forced to leave the capital city.

Transformation to political party 

Considering the dramatic and challenging situation facing PFA following the coup, Ali Karimli took the initiative by leading and protecting the organization from the attacks of the new regime from 1993 until 1997 and restoring its political power. In 1995, with the proposal of Ali Karimli and as a result of internal party discussions, the Popular Front of Azerbaijan was reorganized from a social-political movement into a political party. In the same year, the Popular Front Party of Azerbaijan (PFPA) managed to take seats in Parliament, and Ali Kerimli became a leader of the parliamentary party fraction.

In 2000, after the death of PFPA Chairman Elchibey, Ali Karimli was elected Chairman of the Party. In the 2000 parliament elections, PFPA retook seats, and Ali Karimli was elected the leader of the opposition faction in parliament.

The 2003 Azerbaijani presidential election in Azerbaijan fell short of international norms and standards. They were followed by another wave of repressions against the opposition. Consequently, PFPA first suggested and then proclaimed the unification of opposition as the surest means to free and fair elections. On 18 March 2005 Popular Front Party of Azerbaijan (PFPA) signed an agreement with other opposition parties to establish a united opposition bloc – "Freedom" - for participation in the parliamentary elections in November 2005.

References

External links
Official Party Website

1992 establishments in Azerbaijan
Azerbaijani democracy movements
Azerbaijani nationalism
Nationalist parties in Azerbaijan
Conservative parties in Azerbaijan
Liberal conservative parties
Liberal parties in Azerbaijan
Nationalist parties in Asia
Nationalist parties in Europe
Political parties established in 1992
Political parties in Azerbaijan
Popular fronts in the Soviet Union